Helene Mitterstieler is an Italian luger who competed during the late 1970s and early 1980s. A natural track luger, she won two medals in the women's singles event at the FIL European Luge Natural Track Championships with a gold in 1977 and a silver in 1981.

References
Natural track European Championships results 1970-2006.

Italian female lugers
Italian lugers
Possibly living people
Year of birth missing
Sportspeople from Südtirol